Christopher Scarabosio is a sound editor who started working in sound on Gumby Adventures (1988) as a Sound Effects Assistant, and later as a Sound Editor on The Young Indiana Jones Chronicles. He usually works at Skywalker Sound.

He was nominated at the 80th Academy Awards for the film There Will Be Blood in the category of Best Sound Editing, shared with Matthew Wood. He has, also, received two nominations for the Academy Award for Best Sound Mixing, for his work on Star Wars: The Force Awakens (with Andy Nelson and Stuart Wilson), and Rogue One: A Star Wars Story (with David Parker and, again, Stuart Wilson).

Filmography

He has worked on over 100 films to date since 1992 including...

Volcano - Sound Effects Editor
Titan A.E. - Sound Effects Editor/Assistant Sound Designer/Voice of the Drej Queen 
Titanic - Sound Effects Editor
Young Indiana Jones (TV show and movies) - Sound Editor, Sound Designer (uncredited?)
Star Wars: Episode I – The Phantom Menace - Sound Effects Editor/Voice of Neimoidian Senator
Star Wars: Episode II – Attack of the Clones - Sound FU, Additional Sound Effects (uncredited?)
Star Wars: Episode III – Revenge of the Sith -  Dialogue Editor/Re-Recording Mixer
Star Wars: The Clone Wars TV show - Re-Recording Mixer (season 1 & 4) and Sound Editor (Shades of Reason)
Hellboy - Sound Effects Editor
Pearl Harbor - Sound Editor, Sound Design Editor (uncredited?)
Armageddon - Sound Editor
Avatar - Sound Effects Editor
Tron Legacy - Sound Effects Editor
Whip It - Supervising Sound Editor/Re-Recording Mixer
Ice Age: The Meltdown - Sound Mixing
Eragon - Additional Re-Recording Mixer
Gumby Adventures - Sound Effects Assistant
The Simpsons Movie - Sound Designer/Additional Re-Recording Mixer
Despicable Me - Sound Designer/Supervising Sound Editor/Re-Recording Mixer
Despicable Me 2 - Sound Designer/Additional Re-Recording Mixer
Minions - Sound Designer/Re-Recording Mixer
Zoom - Sound Designer/Supervising Sound Mixer
In God's Hands - Sound Designer/Supervising Sound Editor (uncredited roles)
Lilo and Stitch - Sound Effects Editor, Additional Sound Effects (uncredited?)
The Grand Budapest Hotel - Supervising Sound Editor and Re-Recording Mixer
Junun - Re-Recording Mixer
There Will Be Blood - Sound Designer, Additional Re-Recording Mixer (uncredited?)
The Master - Sound Designer/Supervising Sound Editor/Re-Recording Mixer
Inherent Vice - Sound Designer/Supervising Sound Editor/Re-Recording Mixer
Munich - Sound Effects Editor/Re-Recording Mixer
Indiana Jones and the Kingdom of the Crystal Skull - Additional Sound Design/Re-Recording MixerThe Investigator (1994 TV Movie) - Dialogue EditorPartly Cloudy - Sound DesignerThe Pardon - Sound Designer/Re-Recording MixerRogue One: A Star Wars Story - Sound Designer/Re-Recording MixerChef - Sound Effects EditorHanna - Sound Designer/Supervising Sound Editor/Re-Recording MixerThe Soloist'' - Sound Designer/Supervising Sound Editor/Re-Recording Mixer

References

External links

Sound editors
Living people
Year of birth missing (living people)
Emmy Award winners
Walt Disney Animation Studios people